SD10 may refer to:
 SD-10 (missile), an air-to-air missile
 PowerShot SD10, an ultracompact digital camera produced by Canon
 Sigma SD10, a digital SLR camera
 South Dakota Highway 10, a state highway in South Dakota

 SD-10 (siren) a siren made by Federal Signal.
 EMD SD10, an American diesel locomotive produced by Electro-Motive Diesel.